The Indricotherium Formation is a palaeontological formation located in Kazakhstan. It dates to the Oligocene period.

It is named after Paraceratherium, also commonly known as Indricotherium, an extinct genus of gigantic hornless rhinoceros-like mammals of the family Hyracodontidae.

See also 
 List of fossil sites

References

Further reading 
  (1993); Wildlife of Gondwana. Reed. 

Geologic formations of Kazakhstan
Paleogene System of Asia
Oligocene Series
Paleontology in Kazakhstan